CCGS Limnos is a Canadian Coast Guard coastal research and survey vessel and it is named after the Greek island of Limnos which itself derived from "limni", the Greek word for lake. The ship entered service in 1968 and is currently active. The ship is based on the Great Lakes at the Coast Guard Base in Burlington, Ontario and is used for hydrographic and limnological research.

Description
The ship is also equipped with two Caterpillar C6.6 generators and one Caterpillar C6.6 emergency generator.

The ship is equipped with two laboratories; one  dry laboratory and one  wet laboratory. Limnos has six limnological winches installed. The research vessel is capable of carrying one container on its aft deck. The ship is equipped with Sperry Marine Bridgemaster E radar operating on the E and X bands. Limnos has a complement of 14, composed of 8 officers and 6 crew. There are 16 additional berths.

Service history
The ship was completed in May 1968 and commissioned that year. Limnos gets her name from the word "limnology" which is the division of hydrology that studies inland waters, including their biological, physical, chemical, geological and hydrological aspects. The ship is registered in Ottawa, Ontario.

Limnos was assigned to Canada Centre for Inland Waters at Burlington, Ontario. The ship was initially intended for hydrographic and limnological research, but has been mostly used for the latter. Limnos has served on joint missions on the Great Lakes with vessels from the United States Environmental Protection Agency.

Notes

Citations

Sources
 
 
 

Ships of the Canadian Coast Guard
1968 ships
Ships built in Ontario